Kim Jo-Sun (born June 13, 1975) is a female South Korean archer and Olympic champion. She competed at the 1996 Summer Olympics in Atlanta, where she won a gold medal with the South Korean archery team (with Kim Kyung-wook and Yoon Hye-young).

She won an individual gold medal at the 1998 Asian Games in Bangkok, as well as a team gold medal.

She married table tennis player Kim Taek-soo in 2000.

References

External links

1975 births
Living people
South Korean female archers
Olympic archers of South Korea
Archers at the 1996 Summer Olympics
Olympic gold medalists for South Korea
Olympic medalists in archery
Asian Games medalists in archery
Archers at the 1998 Asian Games
World Archery Championships medalists
Medalists at the 1996 Summer Olympics
Asian Games gold medalists for South Korea
Medalists at the 1998 Asian Games
20th-century South Korean women